The Sydney Wave were formed after the first Australian Baseball League championship purchasing the Sydney Metros licence. The Wave had a bit more luck then the Metros lasting a further two seasons, both at different stadiums before disbanding due to not having a lit stadium and sold their licence to the Hunter Eagles.

See also 
Sport in Australia
Australian Baseball
Australian Baseball League (1989-1999)

External links 
The Australian Baseball League: 1989-1999

Australian Baseball League (1989–1999) teams
Defunct baseball teams in Australia